Journey to Jupiter is a juvenile science fiction novel, the eighth in Hugh Walters' Chris Godfrey of U.N.E.X.A. series. It was published in the UK by Faber in 1965 and in the US by Criterion Books in 1966.

Plot summary
The first crewed expedition to Jupiter reaches speeds never experienced before; despite this it takes several months to reach its objective, leading to tensions among the crew, as well as serious vision problems caused by "light slip". A miscalculation in the gravity of Jupiter means that they will not be able to stop in time and will crash into the giant planet.  A diversion to the jagged Io offers their only chance of survival.

External links
Journey to Jupiter page
review

1965 British novels
1965 science fiction novels
Chris Godfrey of U.N.E.X.A. series
Faber and Faber books
Fiction set on Jupiter
1965 children's books